Joanne Cole (6 June 1934 – 7 August 1985) was a British artist and illustrator. She most notably produced numerous children's books in the 1960s through to the 1980s. She also created artwork and puppets for British TV children's programmes.
Together with husband  Michael Cole they created Bod.

Bod originally appeared as four books, published in the UK by Methuen in 1965 and later released in France and the United States. 
The Coles collaborated on other children books including Wet Albert (1967) about a boy followed around by a rain cloud with crayon drawings by Cole and  a series of four  Kate and Sam books (1971) about the over-imaginative ideas of a young brother and sister.
She also illustrated seven Jill Tomlinson books,  including The Owl Who Was Afraid of the Dark (1973).

In 1972 the Coles created the children's BBC TV show  Fingerbobs, starring  Rick Jones and the finger-puppet adventures of a paper mouse and his friends, made by Cole. 
In 1973 Cole created puppets and artwork for BBC children's programme Ragtime, which won a Society of Film and Television Award (later known as a BAFTA) in 1973 for Best Children's Programme  and was followed by a second series.
In 1975 the original Bod books were developed into a BBC children's show.  The Bod stories were made into 5 minute films animated by Alan Rogers, based on Cole's original drawings, narrated by John Le Mesurier and with music by Derek Griffiths. The rest of the programme, narrated by Maggie Henderson, was made up of Cole's illustrations with games such as Bod snap, songs and stories of Alberto Frog and his Amazing Animal Band.
Bod was broadcast on BBC until 1984. It was also shown in Australia, New Zealand, the Netherlands, Sweden, Finland, Norway, Poland and Israel. In the United States, Bod aired on Nickelodeon as part of the Pinwheel program.
The series of 13 episodes included nine new Bod adventures which were published as books in 1977 and illustrated by Cole.

In 1982 Cole co- wrote with her husband the BBC children's programme Gran. These tales of a most surprising grandmother, which were later developed into books illustrated by Cole, were animated by Ivor Wood  and narrated by Patricia Hayes.

She also provided artwork regularly for ITV's  Rainbow and BBC's Play School.

Cole died of cancer in 1985 aged 51 and in the same year Michael Cole wrote and produced Fingermouse, a musical version of  Fingerbobs starring paper puppets made by Cole.

Publications 

Bod's Apple 1965 Follett Pub. Co 
Bod's Present 1965 Follett Pub. Co ASIN B0000CMRX0
Bod's Dream 1965 Follett Pub. Co 
Bod and the Cherry Tree 1965 Follett Pub. Co 
Wet Albert 1967 Follett Publishing Co ASIN B0000CO53I 
Kate and Sam's Pet 1971 Metheun & Co. Ltd 
Kate and Sam's Tea 1971 Metheun & Co. Ltd 
Kate and Sam's New Home 1971 Metheun & Co. Ltd 
Kate and Sam Go Out 1971 Metheun & Co. Ltd 
The Baby and the Band 1973 Methuen young books 
The Owl Who Was Afraid of the Dark, Jill Tomlinson  1973 Young Puffin Books 
The Hen Who Wouldn't Give Up Jill Tomlinson 1977
The Otter Who Wanted to Know  Jill Tomlinson 1981
The Gorilla Who Wanted to Grow Up Jill Tomlinson 1977
The Aardvark Who Wasn't Sure Jill Tomlinson 1973
Penguin's Progress  Jill Tomlinson 1975
The Cat Who Wanted to Go Home Jill Tomlinson 1972
The Boot in the Field 1973 Methuen young books
It's Ragtime 1976 BBC 
Bod and Breakfast 1977 Methuen Publishing Ltd 
Bod and the Dog 1977 Methuen Publishing Ltd 
Bod and the Grasshopper 1977 Methuen Publishing Ltd 
Bod and the Kite 1977 Methuen Publishing Ltd 
Bod and the Beach 1977 Methuen Publishing Ltd  
Bod and the Cake 1977 Methuen Publishing Ltd 
Bod and the Birds 1977 Methuen Publishing Ltd  
Bod and the Park 1977 Methuen Publishing Ltd 
Bod and the Tiger 1977
 What is Red 1978
 All about me 1978
Gran books 1985

Television 

Bod 
Fingerbobs 
Gran 
Play School
Rainbow
Ragtime
Fingermouse

References

External links

 
 Why Michael Cole Was an Incredible Star of Children's TV

1934 births
1985 deaths
British children's book illustrators